Microsoft Help may refer to:

 Microsoft WinHelp, Windows 3.0
 Microsoft Compiled HTML Help, Internet Explorer 4 and Windows 98
 Microsoft Assistance Markup Language, Windows Vista
 Microsoft Help 2, the help system used by Visual Studio 2002/2003/2005/2008 and Office 2007
 Microsoft Help Viewer, the help system used by Visual Studio 2010